"The Secret of Life" is a song written and recorded by American country music artist Gretchen Peters. It was then recorded by Faith Hill and released in April 1999 as the fifth and final single from her album Faith. It peaked at No. 4 on the U.S. Billboard Hot Country Singles & Tracks chart and at No. 2 on the Canadian RPM Country Tracks chart. It also peaked at No. 46 on the U.S. Billboard Hot 100 chart. Peters included the original version of the song on her 1996 debut album of the same name and later added a new acoustic recording as a bonus track on her 2015 album Blackbirds.

Music video
The night before the video was to be shot, the original location for the bar that the directors scouted out had a fire and burned. The Palace Saloon in Fernandina Beach, Florida (located on Amelia Island) suffered extensive damage to the interior only.  The video opens with a street shot showing the exterior of The Palace with a banner reading "The Starlight Bar & Lounge" covering The Palace sign.  The exterior is used in several shots including Hill standing at the entrance with the doors closed.  The interior of the saloon was rebuilt and remains open to this day and is billed as "Florida's oldest continuously operating bar".  The video showcases Hill as an observer to the bar conversation referenced in the lyrics. Scenes of small-town life are interspersed. Throughout the video, various characters hold up photographs that seem to come to life. Some of the interior scenes were filmed at St. Nick's  lounge in Jacksonville,  Florida. St. Nick's lounge has been a part of the bar scene in Jacksonville since the late 40s. It was directed by Steven Goldmann.

Chart positions
"The Secret of Life" debuted at number 75 on the U.S. Billboard Hot Country Singles & Tracks for the week of May 8, 1999.

Year-end charts

References

1999 singles
1998 songs
Faith Hill songs
Songs written by Gretchen Peters
Song recordings produced by Byron Gallimore
Warner Records singles
Music videos directed by Steven Goldmann